La serpiente de cascabel ( The rattlesnake) is a 1948 Argentine comedy film, directed by Carlos Schlieper and written by Eduardo Antón and Ariel Cortazzo. It was premiered on March 17, 1948.

The film's plot is about a romance between a secondary student (María Duval) who falls in love with her music teacher (Juan Carlos Thorry).

Cast
 Alfredo Alaria
 Beba Bidart 
 Cayetano Biondo 
 María Aurelia Bisutti 
 Susana Campos 
 Homero Cárpena 
 Patricia Castell 
 Ana María Castro
 Max Citelli 
 Alberto Contreras 
 Milagros de la Vega 
 María Duval
 Carlos Fioriti 
 Analía Gadé 
 Enrique García Satur 
 Norma Giménez 
 Diana Ingro
 Marga Landova 
 Graciela Lecube 
 Nelly Meden
 Diana Montes 
 Bertha Moss 
 Mary Parets 
 Teresa Pintos 
 Blanca del Prado 
 Irma Roy
 María Santos 
 Juan Carlos Thorry 
 Jorge Villoldo

References

External links
 

1948 films
1940s Spanish-language films
Argentine black-and-white films
Argentine romantic comedy films
1948 romantic comedy films
1940s Argentine films